Limecola is a genus of saltwater clams, marine bivalve molluscs in the family Tellinidae, the tellins.

Species 
According to the World Register of Marine Species (WoRMS), the following species are included as accepted names within the genus Limecola:
Limecola balthica (Linnaeus, 1758)
Limecola contabulata (Deshayes, 1855)
Limecola petalum (Valenciennes, 1827)

References

Tellinidae
Bivalve genera